Plaveč may refer to:

 Plaveč, Stará Ľubovňa District, village in Stará Ľubovňa District, Slovakia
 Plaveč (Znojmo District), village in Znojmo District, Czech Republic